Do You Believe?, also known as the Believe Tour, was the fourth solo concert tour by American singer-actress Cher. The tour, which took place in 1999 and 2000, promoted her album, Believe.

Not to be confused with the 2012-2013 concert tour by Justin Bieber.

History
The tour began on June 16, 1999 and was initially planned to end on December 15, 1999, but due to it being very commercially successful, the tour was extended from December 30, 1999 to March 5, 2000 in North America. Cyndi Lauper, Wild Orchid, Michael McDonald and Julio Iglesias Jr. were the opening acts at different times during the tour.

The August 28, 1999 performance at the MGM Grand Garden Arena was made into the Emmy Awards-nominated HBO television special Live in Concert, which aired the following day, and by year's end was released on VHS and DVD. As stated by Billboard, the HBO television special was the highest-rated original program in over 2 years.

Costumes
Cher appeared in a variety of costumes during the performance. Her opening outfit, involving a stringed skirt, meshed top over a cross, and a huge red wig, was dubbed self-deprecatingly by her as the "Bozo the Clown-meets-Braveheart look" or the 'Super Groundforce Girl' referring to Charlie Dimmock from the popular-at-the-time Groundforce Gardening show. All in all there were 7 to 9 different ensembles, depending upon how one does the counting, with none lasting more than a handful of songs.

Reception 
Reviews of the show were often favorable, given Cher's return to popularity and over-the-top appeal.
The New York Times said Cher had "a quintessential rock voice ... spectacularly styled with a rough and tumble vaudevillian edge."  The Washington Post viewed it as "a dynamic, over-the-top extravaganza." The Dallas Morning News said "her concert was entertaining and gleefully glitzy."

Set list

"I Still Haven't Found What I'm Looking For"
"All or Nothing"
"The Power"
"We All Sleep Alone"
"I Found Someone"
"The Way of Love"
"Half-Breed"
"Gypsys, Tramps & Thieves"
"Dark Lady"
"Take Me Home"
"After All"
"Walking in Memphis"
"Just Like Jesse James"
"Heart of Stone"
"The Shoop Shoop Song (It's in His Kiss)"
"Dov'è l'amore"
"Strong Enough"
"If I Could Turn Back Time"

Encore
 "Believe"

Tour dates

Cancelled shows

Personnel
Lead Vocals: Cher
Tour Director: Doriana Sanchez
Musical Director: Paul Mirkovich
Costume Design: Bob Mackie

Band
Keyboards: Paul Mirkovich
Guitars: David Barry
Keyboards: Darrel Smith
Bass: Don Boyette
Drums: Mark Schulman
Background vocals: Stacy Campbell
Background vocals: Patty Darcy Jones

Dancers
Dancer: Bubba Carr
Dancer: Aaron James Cash
Dancer: Kristin Richardson (née Willits)
Dancer: Suzanne Easter
Dancer: Tovaris Wilson
Dancer: Addie Yungmee

Notes

References

General
 Angelic Cher  page documenting outfits versus setlist

Cher concert tours
1999 concert tours
2000 concert tours